No. 1426 (Enemy Aircraft) Flight RAF, nicknamed "the Rafwaffe", was a Royal Air Force flight formed during the Second World War to evaluate captured enemy aircraft and demonstrate their characteristics to other Allied units. Several aircraft on charge with the RAE Farnborough section were also used by this unit. The RAE facilities at Farnborough were used for the flight testing of German and Italian aircraft during the war.

Many crash-landed airframes were brought to Farnborough for examination, testing and cannibalisation of spare parts to keep other aircraft in serviceable condition. The main flight testing work was carried out by the Aerodynamics Flight of the Experimental Flying Department and the Wireless & Electrical Flight (W&EF), the latter responsible for evaluation and examination of radar-equipped aircraft later in the war.

History

No. 1426 (Enemy Aircraft) Flight

The unit was established on 21 November 1941 at RAF Duxford, made up of a small group of pilots who had previously been maintenance test pilots with No. 41 Group RAF. Attached at first to 12 Group, its mission was to demonstrate captured types to Allied personnel and expose them to "the appearance, performance, and even the sound" of hostile types. Initially, it operated a Heinkel He 111 H (AW177) shot down in Scotland in February 1940, a Messerschmitt Bf 109 captured during the Battle of France (AE479) (turned over from the Air Fighting Development Unit) and a Junkers Ju 88A-5 (HM509). The Ju 88 was a more recent British acquisition after the pilot landed at night at RAF Chivenor in the belief it was an airfield in France-–the crew had made a navigational error after being deceived by a Meacon. A General Aircraft Monospar was also assigned to the unit for general communication tasks and collecting spare parts.

The aircraft in the unit changed as later marques came into the RAF's hands in various ways, including capture by Allied troops, forced or mistaken landings by German pilots and defections. The flight co-operated with the RAF Film Unit, for which the usual British markings were removed and original German restored. Aircraft were then passed to the AFDU at (RAF Duxford 1940-1943) where they were extensively tested before passing them on to the flight. Several aircraft were lost to crashes or damaged and then cannibalised for spare parts. Others were shipped to America for further evaluation. In March 1943, the unit moved to RAF Collyweston. Beginning in early 1944, the flight made a round of U.S. Army Air Forces bases in Britain. After D-Day, the perceived need for the flight declined.

The flight ceased operations at Collyweston on 17 January 1945, reforming at RAF Tangmere on the same date, with unit codes EA, as the "Enemy Aircraft Flight" of the Central Fighter Establishment, which finally disbanded 31 December 1945.

No. 1426 (Photographic Reconnaissance) Flight
Following disbandment of No. 7 Squadron RAF in December 1955, four crews and their aircraft were detached and sent to the Aden during the "troubles", to carry out patrols as No. 1426 (Photographic Reconnaissance) Flight at RAF Khormaksar, Aden on 1 January 1956 and disbanded at Khormaksar on 31 December 1956, being the last time the Avro Lincoln flew operationally as a bomber.

Aircraft operated, 1941–1945

Axis aircraft
This list may be incomplete and not all Axis aircraft captured and allocated RAF serial numbers were flown by 1426 flight. Others were flown by the Air Fighting Development Unit (AFDU) and the Royal Aircraft Establishment (RAE).

Messerschmitt Bf 109

Focke-Wulf Fw 190

Junkers Ju 88

Other types

Support aircraft
Support aircraft operated by no. 1426 Flight RAF, data from

Aircraft Operated, 1956
Avro Lincoln B.1

Survivors

Four of the aircraft operated by the flight still survive, Bf 109 E-3 DG200, Bf 109 G2 RN228 (known as 'Black 6'), Fiat CR42 BT474 and Ju 88R-1 PJ876.  All are currently displayed at the Royal Air Force Museum London.

See also
 Kampfgeschwader 200
 Zirkus Rosarius, the Luftwaffe unit that test-flew captured Allied aircraft.
 Allied Technical Air Intelligence Unit, the Allied unit that evaluated Japanese aircraft
 Eric "Winkle" Brown, from the Fleet Air Arm of the Royal Navy, the Commander of No. 1426 Flight, who flew most of the aircraft captured, and who holds the world record for having flown the greatest number of distinct aircraft types.
 Roland Falk
 List of Royal Air Force aircraft squadrons
 List of RAF Regiment units
 List of Fleet Air Arm aircraft squadrons
 List of Army Air Corps aircraft units
 List of Royal Air Force aircraft independent flights
 List of RAF Squadron Codes

References
Citations

Bibliography

External links

Royal Air Force
1426 Flight
Military units and formations established in 1941